Miller & Paine was a department store in Lincoln, Nebraska. Founded in 1880, Miller & Paine was acquired by Dillard's in 1988. Prior to the acquisition by Dillard's, Miller & Paine had three stores: two in Lincoln, the downtown flagship store and Gateway Mall with one in the Conestoga Mall in Grand Island, Nebraska. Miller & Paine was one of the first department stores in Lincoln.

History
J.E. Miller arrived in Lincoln from Pennsylvania in 1879 and in 1880 formed a partnership with Dr. Bartlett Paine to build a department store at 13th and O streets in downtown Lincoln. The building was built in 1898. The store was named Miller & Paine. In 1916, a new building was constructed on the site at 13th and O streets.  The new building was designed by Berlinghof & Davis. In 1935, Miller & Paine became the first air-conditioned department store in Nebraska.

Miller & Paine had a lunch counter in the basement and the Tea Room on the fifth floor in the flagship downtown store. Besides having the tearoom and lunch counter, they also had a bakery that was famous for its cinnamon rolls and crumb cookies and made their own candy to sell in their candy department. Miller & Paine imported cinnamon for its trademark cinnamon rolls, and sharp English cheddar cheese for its macaroni & cheese which was served crusted in its own individual serving bowl. The company also owned a farm near Emerald, Nebraska for its own supply of poultry, vegetables and eggs.

In 1960, Miller & Paine opened a store in the newly developed Gateway Mall in Lincoln as an anchor store and in 1974, Miller & Paine opened a store in the Conestoga Mall in Grand Island.

Miller & Paine sold their department stores in 1988 to Dillard's. The department stores ceased to use the name Miller & Paine re-branding the stores Dillard's. Shortly after the purchase, Dillard's closed the downtown store.

The company Miller & Paine continues to operate today as Miller & Paine LLC which operates properties in Lincoln, Nebraska.  The building designed by Berlinghof & Davis at 13th and O Streets is still in use as offices.  The trademark Miller & Paine cinnamon rolls which were once served in the department store's tearooms continue to be produced and sold by the Lincoln, Nebraska-based fast food restaurant Runza, which purchased the rights to the recipe in 2007.

References

External links
 Images of the Miller & Paine building through the years.

Defunct department stores based in Nebraska
History of Lincoln, Nebraska